SMS2 may refer to:

 Sphingomyelin synthase, an enzyme
 Small Multitasking System 2
 SMS-2 weather satellite

See also
 SMS (disambiguation)